Kléber Augusto Caetano Leite Filho (born 2 August 1998), commonly known as Klebinho, is a Brazilian footballer who plays as a right back for Ecuadorian Serie A club Guayaquil City.

Career

Flamengo

Tokyo Verdy (loan)

Cruzeiro (loan)

Guayaquil City
On 27 July 2021 Klebinho terminated his contract with Flamengo and signed with Ecuadorian club Guayaquil City. In this negotiation, Flamengo kept 20% of his economic rights

Career statistics

Club

Notes

Honours
Flamengo
Campeonato Carioca: 2019

References

External links

1998 births
Living people
Brazilian footballers
Brazil youth international footballers
Association football defenders
CR Flamengo footballers
J2 League players
Tokyo Verdy players
Cruzeiro Esporte Clube players
Campeonato Brasileiro Série B players
Ecuadorian Serie A players
Brazilian expatriate sportspeople in Japan
Brazilian expatriate sportspeople in Ecuador
Expatriate footballers in Japan
Expatriate footballers in Ecuador
Footballers from Rio de Janeiro (city)